Charles B. Studley (born January 17, 1929) is a former American football coach.  He served as head coach at University of Cincinnati from 1961 to 1966 and interim head coach of the Houston Oilers in 1983.  Studley finished with a 2–8 record in his only job as an NFL head coach.

Prior to joining the Oilers as a defensive coordinator in 1983, Studley served as defensive coordinator with the San Francisco 49ers.  He was in charge of the defense under Bill Walsh and was responsible for the 49ers being able to hold off the Cincinnati Bengals' rally in Super Bowl XVI.  Studley subsequently served from 1984 to 1986 as defensive coordinator with the Miami Dolphins. Following a tenure as the Dolphins' linebackers coach, he joined the Cincinnati Bengals from 1989 to 1991 as a defensive line coach.

Studley played guard on the 1952 Rose Bowl team at the University of Illinois at Urbana–Champaign.

Studley now resides with his family in Cincinnati, Ohio.

Head coaching record

College

NFL

References

1929 births
Living people
American football guards
Cincinnati Bearcats football coaches
Cincinnati Bengals coaches
Houston Oilers coaches
Illinois Fighting Illini football coaches
Illinois Fighting Illini football players
Miami Dolphins coaches
National Football League defensive coordinators
San Francisco 49ers coaches
UMass Minutemen football coaches
High school football coaches in Illinois
Sportspeople from Maywood, Illinois
Houston Oilers head coaches